Ján Starší (17 October 1933 in Sokolče, Czechoslovakia – 13 April 2019) was a Slovak ice hockey player and coach who competed in the 1960 Winter Olympics.

References

External links

1933 births
2019 deaths
Slovak ice hockey forwards
Czechoslovakia men's national ice hockey team coaches
HC Slovan Bratislava players
HC Sparta Praha players
Ice hockey players at the 1960 Winter Olympics
IIHF Hall of Fame inductees
Olympic ice hockey players of Czechoslovakia
People from Liptovský Mikuláš District
Sportspeople from the Žilina Region
Slovak ice hockey coaches
Czechoslovak ice hockey forwards
Czechoslovak ice hockey coaches
Czechoslovak expatriate ice hockey people
Czechoslovak expatriate sportspeople in West Germany
Czechoslovak expatriate sportspeople in Germany